The Defile is a narrow ice-free passageway between the terminus of Suess Glacier and the talus-covered slope of Nussbaum Riegel in Taylor Valley, Victoria Land. It was charted and descriptively named by the British Antarctic Expedition, 1910–13, under Robert Falcon Scott.

References

Mountain passes of Victoria Land
McMurdo Dry Valleys